Florencia Sophie Sabine Lenne "Florence" Ferreira Fernandes (born 1 December 1968) is a Portuguese slalom canoeist who competed from the mid-1990s to the mid-2000s (decade). She finished 22nd in the K-1 event at the 1996 Summer Olympics in Atlanta. Four years later in Sydney, Fernandes finished 20th after being eliminated in the qualifying round of the K-1 event.

References

1968 births
Canoeists at the 1996 Summer Olympics
Canoeists at the 2000 Summer Olympics
Living people
Olympic canoeists of Portugal
Portuguese female canoeists